Toriaeum or Toriaion was a town of ancient Lycia, inhabited during Roman and Byzantine times. During Roman times it was a Roman colony; during Byzantine times it seems to have appeared in the Synecdemus as Komistaraos.

References

Populated places in ancient Lycia
Former populated places in Turkey
Roman towns and cities in Turkey
Populated places of the Byzantine Empire
History of Antalya Province
Coloniae (Roman)